Non Sung is a district (amphoe) in the central part of Nakhon Ratchasima province, northeastern Thailand.

Etymology
The old name of the district was Klang. The word klang in Thai means 'middle', which refers to the location of the district between the Nok District (now Bua Yai district) and Nai District (Mueang Nakhon Ratchasima district).

When Thai people had to choose a family name at the beginning of the 20th century, many of the locals created names with the word klang.

History
The district's name was changed from Non Wat to Non Sung in 1939.

Geography
Neighbouring districts are (from the north clockwise) Khong, Phimai, Chakkarat, Chaloem Phra Kiat, Mueang Nakhon Ratchasima, Non Thai, and Kham Sakaesaeng.

Ban Non Wat, a village in the district, is an important Bronze Age archaeological site.

Administration
The district is divided into 16 sub-districts (tambons). There are seven townships (thesaban tambons) within the district:  Non Sung covers tambon Non Sung; Talat Khae covers parts of tambon Than Prasat; Don Wai covers tambon Don Wai; Makha covers tambon Makha; Dan Khla covers tambon Dan Khla; Mai covers tambon Mai; and Ho Kham covers tambon Ho Kham.

References

External links
amphoe.com

Non Sung